Vladimir Malenkikh (born October 1, 1980) is a Russian former professional ice hockey defenceman who played most notably in the Kontinental Hockey League (KHL). He was drafted 157th overall by the Pittsburgh Penguins in the fifth round of the 1999 NHL Entry Draft.

Playing career
Malenkikh started his career with Lada Togliatti in 1999 and remained with the team until 2005. He spent the next six seasons with Metallurg Magnitogorsk, staying with the team until the conclusion of the 2010-11 KHL season.

Malenkikh signed with Torpedo Nizhny Novgorod on May 12, 2011, joining the team with long-time friend Alexander Yevseyenkov.

On June 6, 2018, Malenkikh ended his 20 year professional career, announcing his retirement however continuing his association with Lada Togliatti, remaining as an assistant coach for their MHL junior club.

Awards and accomplishments
2007: Russian Superleague champion

References

External links

Vladimir Malenkikh's player profile and career stats at Russian Prospects

1980 births
HC CSK VVS Samara players
HC Lada Togliatti players
Metallurg Magnitogorsk players
Living people
Pittsburgh Penguins draft picks
Russian ice hockey defencemen
Torpedo Nizhny Novgorod players
Sportspeople from Tolyatti